Enver Leif Gjokaj (born February 12, 1980) is an American film and television actor. He is known for his roles as Victor in the science fiction television series Dollhouse and as Daniel Sousa in Agent Carter, a role he later reprised in Agents of S.H.I.E.L.D.

Early life
Gjokaj was born in Orange County, California. His father is Albanian, and his mother is American. Gjokaj has an older brother named Bekim and an identical twin brother named Demir. Both Gjokaj and his brother attended Amador High School, in Sutter Creek, California, where Gjokaj participated in multiple plays and variety shows. Gjokaj graduated with a Master of Fine Arts from New York University's Graduate Acting Program at the Tisch School of the Arts. While at NYU, he was a semi-finalist for Tisch's Vilar Global Fellows Program. In 2002, he received a Bachelor of Arts in English from UC Berkeley.

Career
Beginning in 2009, Gjokaj played the role of Victor on the TV series Dollhouse. His character, whose real name is Anthony Ceccoli, is an "Active" (or "doll") inside the Dollhouse, taking on multiple personalities through the process of highly technological imprinting of memories. His identical twin brother Demir guest starred alongside Gjokaj in a dream sequence in a second-season episode of Dollhouse.

Gjokaj has since appeared in the films The Express: The Ernie Davis Story alongside Dennis Quaid, Taking Chance with Kevin Bacon, and Eagle Eye opposite Shia LaBeouf. Prior to his series regular role on Dollhouse, he appeared in the made-for-TV film Filthy Gorgeous and also had a recurring role on the television series The Book of Daniel. He also guest starred in episodes of Law & Order: Criminal Intent, Community, and The Unit.

In 2012 Gjokaj was awarded a patent for a focusing system for motion picture cameras. Gjokaj has appeared in Emergence as Agent Ryan Brooks, in NCIS: Hawai'i as Navy Captain Joe Milius and in Resident Alien as Joseph in recurring capacities

Gjokaj has made multiple appearances in the Marvel Cinematic Universe. In 2012, Gjokaj made an appearance in The Avengers as a New York City police officer. He starred in the two seasons of Agent Carter (2015–2016) as SSR Agent Daniel Sousa. He went on to reprise the role of Sousa in the final season of Agents of S.H.I.E.L.D (2020).

Filmography

Film

Television

Stage

References

External links
 

1980 births
21st-century American male actors
American male film actors
American male television actors
American people of Albanian descent
Identical twins
Living people
Male actors from Orange County, California
Tisch School of the Arts alumni
American twins
University of California, Berkeley alumni